Justin Eleveld (born 26 May 1992) is a Dutch tennis player.

Eleveld has a career high ATP singles ranking of 828 achieved on 1 November 2010. He also has a career high ATP doubles ranking of 1366 achieved on 10 February 2020.

Eleveld won the 2010 Australian Open boys' doubles title, partnering Jannick Lupescu. They defeated Kevin Krawietz and Dominik Schulz in the final. Eleveld had a career high junior ranking of 24, achieved in 2010.

Junior Grand Slam finals

Doubles

References

External links
 
 

1992 births
Living people
Dutch male tennis players
Grand Slam (tennis) champions in boys' doubles
Australian Open (tennis) junior champions
21st-century Dutch people